Pak Singhar is a town and union council of Tando Allahyar District in the Sindh Province of Pakistan. It is part of Tando Allahyar Taluka and is located to the south-east of the capital. The Union Council has a population of 43,473.

See also
 Ramapir Temple Tando Allahyar

References

Union councils of Sindh
Populated places in Sindh